Rangoon Radha is a 1956 Indian Tamil-language film directed by A. Kasilingam. The film stars Sivaji Ganesan and P. Bhanumathi. Based on the 1944 American film Gaslight, It is about a man trying to steal his wife's fortune. The film was released on 1 November 1956.

Plot 

Kottaiyur Dharmalinga Mudaliyar is a cunning man who appears noble to the outside world. Rangam is his virtuous and long-suffering wife. Dharmalinga Mudaliyaar also has an eye on his sister-in-law Thangam. In order to marry Thangam and get control of the abundant wealth of the sisters, Dharamlingam ensures that everyone believes that Rangam is possessed by some evil spirit and is slowly becoming insane.

Cast 
Sivaji Ganesan as Dharmalingam Mudaliar
P. Bhanumathi as Rangam
S. S. Rajendran as Nagasundaram
Rajasulochana as Radha
M. N. Rajam as Thangam
N. S. Krishnan as Naidu Vaidhiyar
T. A. Mathuram
Rajagopal as Naidu's assistant
Support cast
Nambirajan
Dhakshinamoorthy
Damodharan
P. S. Gnanam
Mohana
Lakshmi Ammal

Production 
The screenplay of Rangoon Radha was written by M. Karunanidhi from a story by C. N. Annadurai. The main plot was inspired by the 1944 American film Gaslight.

Soundtrack 
The music was composed by T. R. Pappa. Lyrics were by Mahakavi Bharathiyar, Bharathidasan, Udumalai Narayana Kavi, M. Karunanidhi, M. K. Athmanathan, N. S. Krishnan and Pattukkottai Kalyanasundaram. Kalyanasundaram was paid 1000 per song.

Release and reception 
Rangoon Radha was released on 1 November 1956. Historian Randor Guy noted, "In spite of the formidable writing credits, excellent cast and outstanding performances, Rangoon Radha did not do well as one had expected. Perhaps the negative role of Sivaji Ganesan had contributed to its not-so-warm welcome". C. N. Annadurai was besotted by the histrionics that Bhanumathi displayed in the film, and conferred upon her the title Nadippukku Ilakkanam (grammar for acting).

References

External links 
 

1950s Tamil-language films
1956 films
Films scored by T. R. Pappa
Films with screenplays by M. Karunanidhi
Indian remakes of American films
Indian black-and-white films